Giacomo Volpe (born 16 January 1996) is an Italian footballer who plays as a goalkeeper for  club Feralpisalò.

Career
He made his Serie C debut for Gubbio on 27 August 2017 in a game against Pordenone.

On 23 August 2021, he signed a one-year contract with Foggia.

On 16 July 2022, Volpe moved to Arzignano on a one-year contract.

On 18 January 2023, Volpe signed with Feralpisalò.

References

External links
 

1996 births
Living people
People from Biella
Sportspeople from the Province of Biella
Footballers from Piedmont
Italian footballers
Association football goalkeepers
Serie B players
Serie C players
Serie D players
Juventus F.C. players
S.S.D. Correggese Calcio 1948 players
A.S. Gubbio 1910 players
U.S. Cremonese players
Calcio Foggia 1920 players
F.C. Arzignano Valchiampo players
FeralpiSalò players